Edson Brown (May 16, 1935 – September 12, 1962) was an American amateur boxer. He competed in the men's featherweight event at the 1952 Summer Olympics. He won the New York Golden Gloves featherweight title in 1953 and 1954, and was an Eastern Golden Gloves champion as well.

Brown was called "Little Joe" due to his resemblance to Jersey Joe Walcott. He died on September 12, 1962, at the age of 27.

References

External links
 

1935 births
1962 deaths
American male boxers
Olympic boxers of the United States
Boxers at the 1952 Summer Olympics
Boxers from New York City
Featherweight boxers